Wolayta,  Wolayita or Wolaita may refer to:
 Wolayta people, an ethnic group of Ethiopia
 Wolaytta language, spoken by the Welayta people
 Wolayita Zone, a zone in SNNPR, Ethiopia
 Kingdom of Welaytta, a Welaytta kingdom founded in medieval times surviving until the 19th century, see List of rulers of Welayta

See also 
 Welayta Dicha, an Ethiopian football club